The 24th BRDC International Trophy was a non-championship Formula One race held at Silverstone on 23 April 1972. The race was also run to Formula 5000 regulations.

Classification 
''Note: a blue background indicates a car running under Formula 5000 regulations.

Notes
Pole position: Emerson Fittipaldi - 1:18.1
Fastest lap: Mike Hailwood - 1:18.8

References

BRDC International Trophy
BRDC International Trophy
Formula 5000 race reports
BRDC